Lowell Fitz Randolph (7 October 1894 – 28 May 1980) was an American scientist, in the field of genetics, botany and horticulture. He was a Cornell University graduate who became Professor of Botany and was also employed as an associate cytologist for the United States Department of Agriculture. He was also an avid iris collector and wrote a book on the Iris genus. He carried out important research into plant chromosomes of iris, orchid genus and corn plants (such as maize). He was sometimes known as "Fitz" by his many friends and associates.

Education and early life
Lowell Fitz Randolph, was born on 7 October 1894 in Alfred, New York. Lowell's family had over 200 years of history of being deeply involved in the Seventh Day Baptist Church community, and that Lowell and his sister Vida were the first to break with that community and strong tradition and follow independent, secular paths pursuing their passion for science. Lowell was educated at local schools in Alfred and graduated from Alfred University in 1916.

In 1918, he then went to Cornell University to complete his Ph.D. and work as an assistant in botany under Rollins A. Emerson and Prof. L. W. Sharp.
His thesis was on the development of normal and abnormal chloroplasts in maize, which was completed under Prof. Sharp's direction in 1921.
He then studied cytology with Lester in the Botany Department and minored in Plant Breeding with Emerson.

In 1920, he attend the meetings of the American Association for the Advancement of Science in Chicago, and presented a paper to the American Naturalist Division on 'A case of maternal inheritance in Maize: Cytological Relations'. He is a member of the Association and of the Botanical Society of America.

In 1907, Herbert J. Webber started the Synapsis Club, a student/faculty organization at Cornell, Prof. Emerson continued the club and encouraged his students to become members, including Randolph. He also became a member of the Gamma Alpha Graduate Scientific Fraternity and of the Cornell Biological Society.

In 1921, he obtained his Ph.D. degree, in the botany department.

Career
In May 1922, he published 'Cytology of Chlorophyll Types of Maize' in the Botanical Gazette, Vol. 73, No. 5, pp. 337–375. Then he started working as Prof. Sharp's teaching assistant in the winter term of 1922.

He also was an instructor in botany, until 1923, when Prof. Emerson recommended Randolph to get a United States Department of Agriculture (USDA) appointment at Cornell to investigate corn chromosome cytology. He started working as cytologist (cell biologist) with the Office of Cereal Investigations, for the USDA, Several other graduate students, including George Beadle, and Marcus Rhoades, were also supported at Cornell by USDA funds. He was stationed at Cornell (while working for the Office) and so could continued his research work with corn and his association with the University's Department of Botany.
 
In 1924, he started on an Advanced genetics course of Emerson and started to use John Belling's iron-aceto-carmine smear technique to clarify chromosome numbers.

In September 1924, Barbara McClintock (a 2nd year graduate), started worked as a research assistant to Randolph, as well as a working as a teaching assistant to Prof. Sharp. They then started to apply the smear technique to pollen cells of corn and hypothesized the origin of polyploidy in Maize. In 1925, they discovered a corn plant had three complete sets of chromosomes (meaning it was a triploid). They also studied the meiotic (cell division) behaviour of the chromosomes in the pollen of the corn.
The results of the study were published in 1926. L.F. Randolph and B. McClintock 1926, 'Polyploidy in Zea mays' L. in American Naturalist, Vol.LX (666) Jan-Feb on pages 99–102.  McClintock was very upset that her name appeared second in the article, since she thought that she had completed most of the research. Also their study techniques were also very different. Randolph was very careful, cautious and meticulous, where as McClintock liked to try out and modify new techniques. After she altered the Belling technique, Randolph was furious at me, and That was the beginning and end of a friendship she recalled in 1978. Randolph ended their collaboration and McClintock began to work under Prof. Sharp, who gave her more freedom. In 1926, he reported their findings at the 1926 International Botanical Congress at Cornell, and he then published  'A cytological study of two types of variegated pericarp in Maize' in Agr. Expt. Sta. Mem. Vol.102, (page 14).

Between 1926 and 1927, he spent a year visiting several laboratories in Europe under a travelling fellowship of the International Education Board.

In 1928, he published 'Types of supernumeracy chromosomes in Maize', in Anatomical Record Vol.41 on page 102, and published 'Chromosome Numbers in Zea mays L'.

In the early 1930s, 2 technical assistants to Randolph were paid by the USDA, to maintain the stock collecting of the maize fields and assist in hand pollination.
He also became interested in the chromosomes and evolution of wild and cultivated iris. He and his students at Cornell, started following up on the work on chromosome studies of garden irises by Marc Simonet at the Genetic Institute at Versailles, France in 1930s.

But he stilled carried on his maize research, and in 1932, he published 'Some effects of high temperature on polyploidy and other variations in Maize', in Genetics Vol.18 on page 222–229.(page656) Then in 1936, he published 'Developmental morphology of the caryopsis in maize' in J. Agric. Res.  Vol.53 (pages 881-916).

Randolph and his wife Fannie made several trips to Europe collecting irises. They travelled to England (between 1936 and 1939, also in 1950 and 1959), France (in 1950 and 1954), Denmark (in 1950), and Sweden (in 1950). He also led expeditions in search of new forms of iris, including Iris pumila.

In 1939, he was appointed Professor of botany at Cornell, a title which he held concurrently until 1947, when he resigned from his position with the federal Department of Agriculture, so that he could concentrate his research on cytogenetics in the Department of Botany.

In 1940, he published with D.B. Hand, 'Relation between carotenoid content and number of genes per cell in diploid and tetraploid corn' in J. Agric. Res. Vol.60 (pages 51–64), then Randolph did a comprehensive study of Maize 'B chromosome' inheritance in 1941.

In a complaint letter to Marcus Morton Rhoades (Editor of Genetics journal) in 1942, he criticised Barbara McClintock's editing the work of a pupil of Randolph's. Calling her a prima donna, who wants to be the goddess of science and godmother to aspiring young scientists everywhere.

After World War II, he began to study corn seed that had been exposed to atomic radiation at Bikini Atoll, in the Pacific Ocean. he then published the results in the Science Journal.

In 1943, he and L.G. Cox published 'Factors influencing the germination of Iris seed and the relation of inhabiting substances to embryo dormancy' Pro.Am.Soc.Hort.Sci. Vol.43 (page284-300).

He was appointed chairman of the Scientific Committee of the American Iris Society, between 1945, and 1946. He started the counting of chromosomes of iris, growing seeds in vitro and classification of the genus. He also published in 1945, 'Embryo culture of Iris seed' Bull.Am.Iris Soc. Vol.97 (page 33-45).

He was still president of the Cornell University chapters of Phi Kappa Phi (between 1947–48) and Sigma Xi (between 1953–54).

He also collected with Efraim Ildefonso Hernández-Xolocotzi Guzman (1913–1991) in Mexico for the Natural History Museum and Grey Herbarium. Finding and publishing Tripsacum zopilotense Hernandez-Xolocotzi, E. & Randolph, L.F. in 1950, in Guerrero, Mexico.

In 1951, C.F. Konzak, Randolph and L.F. Jensen published 'Embryo culture of Barley species hybrids. Cytological studies of Hordeum sativum x Hordeum bulbosum' in J. Heredity Vol.42 (pages125-134).

In 1954, he went to Europe and the Middle East on an iris hunting field trip, which included Switzerland, France, Italy, Yugoslavia, Germany, Austria, Cypress, Turkey, Lebanon, and Egypt.

In 1955, Randolph and his wife (Fannie), published 'Embryo culture of Iris seed', in the 'Bulletin of the American Iris Society' Vol.139 pages 7–17, this was an updated publication that he had earlier published (solo) in 1945. He also published 'Cytogenetic aspects of the origin and evolutionary history of corn' in 'Corn and Corn improvement' (G.F. Sprague Editor) pages 16–57

During 1956 and 1959, he was made Membership Chairman for American Iris Society (AIS).

He then spent six months in 1957–58 at Aligarh Muslim University in India with a Fulbright Award, as a consultant on embryo culture.

In 1959, he wrote and had published Garden Irises, which has 575 pages. Within the book, the chapter, 'Chromosomes of Garden varieties of Bearded Iris',(pages315-324) showed his academic interest. He also re-organised the William Dykes classification of irises, by moving certain irises into different sections and subgenra. This classification is still used by the American Iris Society.

He served as the vice president and then became the 9th, President of the American Iris Society from 1960 to 1962. Randolph and his wife, kept an extensive collection of iris in his garden at their home in Ithaca, which attracted many visitors.

He was not only interested in irises but also orchids, specifically the genus Dendrobium. In 1960, T. Vajrabhaya and Randolph published 'Chromosome studies in Dendrobium' in Amer. Orchid Soc. Bull. Vol.29 (pages 507-517).

In 1961, he published 'Cytotaxonomic studies of Louisiana Irises' in Bot Gazette Vol.123 (pages 125-133) with Jyotirmay Mitra.

After nearly 40 years at Cornell, he retired in 1961, but started working part-time during the winters, at the Fairchild Tropical Garden, in Miami, Florida as a research collaborator. Including work on Tripsacum grasses, which he imported from Mexico and Guatemala. He then spent his summers back home at Ithaca. He also started working on the evolutionary history of maize.

In 1966, Iris nelsonii was first published and described by Randolph in 'Baileya' (a Quarterly Journal of Horticultural Taxonomy of Ithaca, NY) 14: 150 in 1966. The species was named after Ira S. "Ike" Nelson, professor of horticulture at the University of Louisiana, Lafayette, and one of the founders, and early show managers, of the Society for Louisiana Irises. Nelson collaborated with Randolph, and together they identified Iris nelsonii, and Randolph named it after Nelson.

In 1966, Randolph LF and Randolph also published 'Iris species collecting trips abroad' Medianite Vol.7 Issue 4 (pages61-65).

In 1967, Randolph, I.S. Nelson and R.L. Plaisted published 'Negative evidence of introgression affecting the stability of Louisiana Iris species' Cornell Univ Ag. Exp. Station Mem. Vol.398 (pages 1–56).
This paper reviewed the morphological and pollen fertility data collected for Iris fulva, Iris brevicaulis and Iris hexagona and other hybrid iris populations. He concluded that between the Louisiana iris species was localized hybridization.

In late 1970, he published 'Variation among Tripsacum populations of Mexico and Guatemala' in Brittonia Vol.22 (page 305-337).

In 1976, he published 'Contributions of wild relatives of maize to the evolutionary history of domesticated maize: a synthesis of divergent hypotheses in Economic Botany, Vol.30 (pages321-345), which discounted the role of teosinte as an ancestor of maize.

Lowell died in Ithaca in 1980.

Awards and honours
He was award many honours including;

 For his work with iris he received the Vaughn Award (named after Leonard H. Vaughan (President of a seed company and former school board president,)for outstanding contributions to horticulture from the American Society for Horticultural Science (1944).
 Distinguished Service Medal from the American Iris Society (1951),
 Foster Memorial Plaque (named after Sir Michael Foster of the British Iris Society (1955), with N. Leslie Cave.
 Citation for distinguished contributions to horticulture from the American Horticultural Society (1962),
 Bronze medal from the Internationale Gartenbauaustellung, Hamburg, West Germany (1963), 
 Gold medal from the American Iris Society in 1970.
 The Randolph-Perry Medal, this is the highest award given by the American Iris Society, started in 2000 and is restricted to species hybrid Irises. It was named after Dr Randolph and Amos Perry (1871-1953), (Father-in-law of Frances Perry) and a British nurserymen and iris hybridizer, and the winner of the first ever Dykes Medal, named after William Rickatson Dykes.

Personal life
He married a fellow Cornell graduate student in Botany, Fannie C. Rane in 1922. She got her MS degree in Botany in 1923.

They settled in Ithaca, and brought up three children. Robert Fitz Randolph (later of Manlius), on 20 December 1927, Elizabeth Jane (Randolph) DeMott (later of Herndon, Virginia,) and Rane Fitz Randolph.

They also had nine grandchildren.

His daughter, Elizabeth Jane DeMott died on 16 March 2009, after her brother Rane had died.

Selected publications about Irises
 Randolph, L. F., (1934), Bulletin of the American Iris Society 52: 61–66.
 Randolph, L. F., (1947), Bulletin of the American Iris Society 107: 67–78.
 Randolph, L. F., (1955), The Geographic Distribution of European and Eastern Mediterranean Species of Bearded Iris, The Iris Year Book 1955, p. 35-46.
 Randolph, L. F., (1956), Crossability of bearded iris species. Bulletin of the American Iris Society No. 140: p. 24-31. 50–60.
 Randolph, L. F., (editor), Garden Irises (1959), American Iris Society.
 Randolph, L. F., (1957), "More medans". Bulletin of the American Iris Society No. 144: p. 10-24. January, 1957. Illustrations of I. rubromarginata, I. aphylla, I. bosniaca, I. chamaeiris.
 Randolph, L. F., (1957), Cytogenetics of Median bearded Irises. Bulletin of the American Iris Society No. 145: p. 1-8. April, 1957. I. attica ‘Parnes'.
 Randolph, L. F., (1959), "Karyotypes of Iris species." American Journal of Botany 46, 2.
 Randolph, L. F., (1966),‘Iris nelsonii' in Baileya 14:143 (1966), New York.
 Randolph, L. F., & Fannie Randolph, (1959), Collecting Irises Abroad, Bulletin of the American Iris Society No. 155, p5-11, July, 1961.
 Randolph, L. F., & F. Randolph, (1961), Collecting Iris Species in Europe, Bulletin of the American Iris Society No. 162, p37-39, July, 1961.
 Randolph, L. F., & Katherine Heinig, (1953), Chromosome Studies of Dwarf Iris Species and Hybrids, The Iris Year Book 1953. P. 45–52.
 Randolph, L. F., & G. H. Lawrence, (1958), Classification of Eupogon Irises, Bulletin of the American Iris Society No. 148, p. 9-17. January, 1958.
 Randolph, L. F., & Mitra, Jyotirmay, (1956), Chromosome numbers of Iris species. Bulletin of the American Iris Society, No. 140, p. 50-60.
 Randolph, L. F., & Mitra, J., (1959), ‘Karyotypes of Iris pumila and related species' in American Journal of Botany 46::93-102. Baltimore.
 Randolph, L. F., & Mitra, J., (1959), Iris Chromosome Numbers, Bulletin of the American Iris Society, No. 152, p. 5-9, January 1959.
 Randolph, L. F., & Mitra, J., (1960), Chromosomes of Aril and Arilbred Irises, Bulletin of the American Iris Society, No. 157, p. 41-60.April 1960.
 Randolph, L. F., & Mitra, J., (1961), ‘Karyotypes of Iris species indigenous to the USSR . American Journal of Botany. 48, 10.
 Randolph, L. F., & Mitra, J., (1962), The dwarf bearded Iris hybrids of Goos and Koeneman. Caryolog. 15, 3: 477–483.

References

1894 births
1980 deaths
Cornell University faculty
American botanists
Alfred University alumni
Cornell University College of Agriculture and Life Sciences alumni
Scientists from Ithaca, New York